Spilarctia irina is a moth in the family Erebidae. It was described by Vladimir Viktorovitch Dubatolov in 2006. It is found in western Indonesia.

References

Moths described in 2006
irina